is a Japanese boxer in the flyweight (112 lb/50 kg) division and a former WBA flyweight champion.

Sakata was the premier boxer in the Kyoei boxing gym before the arrival of Kōki Kameda in 2005. He stayed out of the limelight for most of his career, even being used as Kameda's sparring partner, but finally won a world title in 2007, defeating Lorenzo Parra for the vacant WBA Flyweight title.

Biography

Early career 
Sakata began boxing when he joined his school's amateur boxing team in his first year in high school. He quit after only a couple months, but returned to boxing in his senior year, when he entered a local boxing gym, run by the father of former WBA Middlweight champion Shinji Takehara. He moved to Tokyo during summer vacation, and entered the Kyoei boxing gym to begin serious training.

Professional career 
Sakata won his debut fight by 3rd-round TKO in 1998. He won the Japanese Flyweight title in 2001, and defended the title three times before losing by 10-round decision to Trash Nakanuma in 2002. He fought Nakanuma again in April, 2003, and won by decision, regaining his title. He defended the title two more times before returning it.

On June 4, 2004, Sakata fought Lorenzo Parra for the WBA Flyweight title at the Ariake Coliseum in Tokyo, Japan, but lost by 12-round decision. He fought Parra again in September of the same year, but lost by decision again.

He marked five straight wins after his losses against Parra, and fought Roberto Vasquez in Paris, France, for the WBA Flyweight interim title on December 2, 2006. He suffered a knockdown in the 5th round, but fought back hard in the second half, and Vasquez barely managed to keep his title with a 2-1 split decision.

World champion 
On March 9, 2007, Sakata fought WBA Flyweight champion Lorenzo Parra for the third time, and became the champion by TKO in the 3rd round. This was Sakata's first win out of four world title matches. The day before the fight, Parra could not make the 112 lb weight limit. He tried again two hours later, but was still 4 pounds overweight. As a consequence, Parra was stripped of the title and fined 35% of his fight money. The WBA decided to hold the title match with a bantamweight limit (118 lb/53 kg), and Parra was introduced as the former champion for the fight.

Sakata has since then defended his title four times. Most recently, he retained it with a unanimous decision win over Hiroyuki Hisataka on July 30, 2008. On his fifth defense however, he was dismantled in two rounds by Denkaosan Kaovichit of Thailand on December 31, 2008.

Attempt to regain crown 
Sakata received an opportunity to take back the WBA 112-lb title on September 25, 2010. There, he faced Daiki Kameda who won the title from Kaovichit in two attempts. Unfortunately for Sakata, Kameda won the bout on all score cards.

Retirement
On January 13, 2011, he announced his retirement from the ring.

See also 
List of WBA world champions
List of flyweight boxing champions
List of Japanese boxing world champions
Boxing in Japan

References

External links 
 
Takefumi Sakata official blog (Japanese)

1980 births
Flyweight boxers
Living people
People from Aki Province
World Boxing Association champions
Japanese male boxers
Sportspeople from Hiroshima Prefecture